Lac La Biche-McMurray was a provincial electoral district in Alberta, Canada, mandated to return a single member to the Legislative Assembly of Alberta using first-past-the-post balloting from 1971 to 1986.

It replaced the district of Lac La Biche with minimal boundary changes in 1971, and when abolished in 1986, was replaced by Athabasca-Lac La Biche and Fort McMurray. It differed from the current Fort McMurray-Lac La Biche riding in that it included the entire city of Fort McMurray.

Representation history

The riding's first MLA was Dan Bouvier, newly-minted member for Lac La Biche. Elected under the Social Credit banner, he resigned from caucus a year later "in the interest of [his] constituents". He did not run again in the 1975 election.

The riding was then picked up by the governing Progressive Conservatives, with Ron Tesolin winning by a large margin over four rivals. He served only one term as MLA, but Norm Weiss held the riding for the PCs for two more terms.

Lac La Biche-McMurray was then abolished for the 1986 election and replaced with Fort McMurray, where Weiss would go on to serve two more terms, and Athabasca-Lac La Biche, which would be picked up by the New Democrats.

Boundary History

Electoral results

1971 general election

1975 general election

1979 general election
In the late 70's, the population of Lac La Biche-McMurray inflated alongside the economic boom in the Athabasca oil sands, seen in the near-doubling of eligible electors for the 1979 election.

1982 general election

References

Further reading

External links
Elections Alberta
The Legislative Assembly of Alberta

Former provincial electoral districts of Alberta